Megommation is a genus of bees belonging to the family Halictidae.

The species of this genus are found in Southern America.

Species:

Megommation amazonicum
Megommation eickworti 
Megommation festivagum 
Megommation insigne 
Megommation minutum 
Megommation ogilviei

References

Halictidae